The Farman F.50 was a French twin-engined night bomber designed and built by Farman as a replacement for the single-engined Voisin pusher biplanes in service with the French Air Force.

Development
The twin-engined F.50 flew for the first time in early 1918, powered by two  Lorraine 8Bb engines, as an unequal-span biplane with a slab-sided fuselage and a single fin and rudder. It had a fixed tailskid landing gear with twin wheels on the main gear, an open cockpit for the pilot and gunner/observer, and a gunner position in the nose.  It was equipped with a 7.7 mm machine gun forward and aft.

The two engines,  Lorraine 8Bd V-8s on production aircraft, were mounted between the wings using vee bracing struts. With the Armistice, production was less than 100 aircraft, but the company designed a passenger conversion for civil use, designated F.50P, with the fuselage behind the cockpit raised and enclosed to create a glazed cabin for up to five passengers. One example was used by Compagnie des Grands Express Aeriens from July 1920 from Paris to London and Amsterdam.

Operational history
With the military designation Bn.2 (2-seat night bomber) the aircraft were delivered to squadrons within 1e Groupe de Bombardement. Three escadrilles (S25, F114 and F119) had been equipped by the time of the Armistice in November 1918, with 45 F.50s in service. With the end of the war the aircraft did not have time to influence the campaign and the aircraft continued to serve until at least 1922.

Two aircraft were sold to the United States after the war.

Variants
F.50
Twin-engine night bomber.
F.50P
Five-passenger conversion.

Operators

Air Union (F.50P)
Compagnie des Grands Express Aériens -(F.50P)
French Air Force

Imperial Japanese Army Air Service - One F.50.

Mexican Air Force - Thirteen F.50 bought in September 1920.

Specifications (F.50)

References

Bibliography
 The Illustrated Encyclopedia of Aircraft (Part Work 1982–1985), 1985, Orbis Publishing, Page 1736/7

1910s French bomber aircraft
1910s French airliners
F.0050
Aircraft first flown in 1918